The Islamic Azad University, Najafabad Branch (IAUN) (Persian: دانشگاه آزاد اسلامی واحد نجف‌آباد), also known as the University of Najafabad or Azad University of Najafabad, is an independent comprehensive branch of the Islamic Azad University system, located in Najafabad, Isfahan, Iran.

IAUN was established in January, 1985 with the aim of training professionals needed for high scientific positions. This university boasts of 29 years of service educating 26,000 university students in 250 different majors in Bachelor's, Master's and Ph.D. programs. It has been able to train 73,793 graduates including 1,340 Ph.D. and 6,500 M.A. graduates. The total number of the full-time, part-time and adjunct professors in this university is above 1,500. With over twenty five years of service, this university is now one of the most prominent centers in Isfahan Province and one of the most distinguished ones in higher education in Iran, and with its precise and professional management in a 20-year strategic framework in different research, scientific, cultural and educational fields, it has gained a lot of domestic and foreign recognition, among which one can refer to gaining the Gold Medal of Quality Management in the Century based on the QC100 standard from the BID International Institute in Madrid, Spain in 2013 with 118 countries voting for it. This university was introduced as the first independent branch of the Islamic Azad University and appointed as an independent comprehensive university with the total score of 5951.68. According to the Times University Rankings, the university ranked first among Azad universities in 2022. It was also ranked 501-600th in the university's global rankings.

Infrastructures and facilities
 A campus of 12,779,199.83 square meters
 The total construction area of 336,720 square meters
 The total administrative and educational area of 38,000 square meters
 The total under-construction area of 71,500 square meters including a 200-bed hospital
 The total green space of 1,885,000 square meters
 The total gardening and agricultural area of 10,782,257 square meters
 The first rank in having the most land and building possession in the country
 The ratio of 1 student to 16 square meters of educational space (the standard ratio is 1:12 square meters)
 17 sports complexes with the total area of 60,857 square meters in the following fields: body building, karate, gymnastics, freestyle and Greco-Roman wrestling, futsal, basketball, volleyball, ping-pong, zurkhaneh (traditional Persian sports center), chess, handball, badminton, fitness program, judo, taekwondo, indoor swimming pool (with wet and dry sauna and jacuzzi) and indoor and outdoor fields for: soccer, track and field, basketball, volleyball and futsal
 9 dormitories for male and female students (4 and 5, respectively) with the total area of 31,830 square meters
 3 mosques with the total area of 4,000 square meters
 8 meeting and conference halls seating 5,000 people
 11 faculties with the total area of 84,864 square meters
 The largest academic library in Iran with the total area of 34,764.15 square meters in 8 floors
 A five-story hospital located in Isfahan, Iran with the total area of 2,937.77 square meters
 249 university majors in Bachelor's, Master's and Ph.D. programs
 85,545 alumni in associate degree, Bachelor's, Master's and Ph.D. programs
 487 full-time and part-time faculty board members

Academics

Academic campus

The largest academic library of Iran is located on this campus.

Faculties/colleges
 Faculty of Human Sciences
 Faculty of Law and Islamic Theology
 Faculty of Engineering|Technology and Engineering
 Faculty of Civil Engineering
 Faculty of Medical Science
 Faculty of Nursing and Midwifery
 Faculty of Material Engineering
 Faculty of Fine Arts|Arts, Architecture and Urban Planning
 Faculty of Electrical Engineering
 Faculty of Nuclear Engineering and Fundamental science|Basic Sciences
 Faculty of computer Engineering
 Sama Technical and Vocational College

Education
At present, IAUN is offering 125 degree programs including 1 associate degrees, 66 bachelor's degrees, 37 master's degrees, 20 doctor of philosophy and doctor of medicine. Currently, the university has 25,303 enrolled students and about 70376 alumni as of the academic year 2013–2014.

IAUN monthly newsletter, Talieh, in its first issue titling the university chancellor Dr. Mohammad Amiri's speech "IAU Najafabad Branch soon will be the second Sharif University in Iran".

The university is home to the largest academic library in Iran that is more than 35,000 metres in seven floors. Beside the printed materials there are access to many electronic materials and e-books and e-journals.

Enrollments

Source:

Rankings

National
Webometrics rankings
2014 (February Release)''': 43

SCImago rankings
2012: 64
2013: 64
2014: 54

Other rankings
2010: 6th among Islamic Azad University branches.
2019: 1st among Islamic Azad University branches
2020: 1st among Islamic Azad University branches
2021: 1st among Islamic Azad University branches

International
 The World University Rankings
 World University Rankings 2022: 501-600th 
 Impact Rankings 2021: 801-1000th 
 Webometrics rankings
 2015 (February Release): 2,987
 2015 (February Release): 2,728

SCImago rankings
 2012: International rank: 2,506
 2013: International rank: 2,514
 2014: International rank: 2,283

Presence in social networking websites
IAUN is pioneer in representing itself in social networking websites among other higher educational institutes in Iran since there has been restrictions from the government for such institutions not to have any presence in foreign social networking websites. However, IAUN is the first university in Iran having an official page in social networking websites. Starting from early January 2014, the university announced using Instagram as the first social networking website to have an official page on.

See also
 Higher education in Iran
 Najafabad's library management system
 List of universities in Iran
 List of Universities in Isfahan Province

References

External links

 
 Official page of IAUN on Instagram
 Official page of IAUN on Google Plus
 Azad News Agency (ANA), official News Agency of the Islamic Azad University
 IAUN Central Library
Universities in Iran
 List of Iranian universities
 List of Universities, Institutes and Colleges

1985 establishments in Iran
Educational institutions established in 1985
najafabad|Najafabad
Universities in Isfahan Province
Najafabad
Education in Isfahan
Engineering universities and colleges in Iran
Medical schools in Iran